Picilorex (INN; brand name Roxenan; IUPAC: 3-(4-Chlorophenyl)-5-cyclopropyl-2-methylpyrrolidine) is an anorectic which is no longer marketed. It is a monoamine reuptake inhibitor, a stimulant as well as a derivate of Pyrrolidine.

See also 

 α-PHP
 α-PHPP
 Pyrovalerone
 Prolintane
 Rolicyclidine (PCPy) 
 MDPV
 List of aminorex analogues
 Substituted phenylmorpholine

References

Anorectics
Norepinephrine–dopamine reuptake inhibitors
Chlorobenzenes
Pyrrolidines
Substituted amphetamines
Stimulants